"Subdivisions" is a song by Canadian progressive rock group, Rush, released as the second single from their 1982 album Signals.

The song was a staple of the band's live performances, is played regularly on classic-rock radio, and appears on several greatest-hits compilations. It was released as a single in 1982, and despite limited success on the UK charts, the song had significant airplay in Great Britain. In the United States, it charted at No. 5 on the Billboard Bubbling Under Hot 100 chart and No. 5 on the Mainstream Rock Tracks chart. Played live prior to its release, numerous pre-release live versions have circulated among collectors for years.

Lyrics and background
The song is a commentary on social stratification through the pressure to adopt certain lifestyles. It describes young people dealing with a "cool" culture amidst a comfortable yet oppressively mundane suburban existence in housing subdivisions. Anyone who does not obey social expectations is regarded as an outcast; the lyrics flatly describe a choice of "conform or be cast out".

"Subdivisions" was one of five Rush songs inducted into the Canadian Songwriters Hall of Fame on 28 March 2010. The band asked Jacob Moon to perform his version of the song at the gala in their absence.

The song became available as downloadable content for the music video game Rock Band 3 on 2 November 2010, in Basic rhythm as well as PRO mode which takes advantage of the use of a real guitar, bass guitar, and standard MIDI-compatible electronic drum kits in addition to vocals.

Neil Peart, the band's drummer and lyric writer, said of the song: Hugely autobiographical of course. It was an important step for us, the first song written that was keyboard-based. The upside of that: people don’t realize is that it made Alex and I the rhythm section. So the first time he and I tuned in to each other's parts was when Geddy was playing keyboards. It was a great new way for us to relate. It's also a good example of us learning to go into time signature changes more fluidly, and again, wonderful to play live. Lyrically, Geddy contributed by improvising "Battle Cars" instead of "Backs of cars" during recording and in live performances. It was a nice touch that better emphasized the struggle, or battle, we have with subdividing our lives. It's challenging and always rewarding to play decently.

The title of the song is heard twice per chorus, spoken by Neil Peart, and is lip-synched in the video by Alex Lifeson. Live performances include a sample of Neil's voice, triggered at the appropriate moments while still being lip-synched by Lifeson.

Music video

The promotional video scenes were filmed in the Greater Toronto Area. The downtown scenes were filmed in downtown Toronto, most notably the opening zoom out shot of the intersection of King Street and Bay Street, while the suburbs scenes were filmed in Scarborough, near Warden and Finch Avenues. The aerial zoom out is of Sandy Haven Drive in Scarborough at the north east corner of Warden Avenue and McNicoll Avenue. The high school scenes were filmed at L'Amoreaux Collegiate Institute, in the same area. The video also features scenes of the Don Valley Parkway (with a GO train seen crossing in the foreground), Highway 401 (at the 404 interchange), and a busy PATH tunnel.

The lead character is played by Dave Glover, a L'Amoreaux student at the time.

The arcade game featured at the end of the video is Atari's Tempest. The video game arcade was a real arcade, not staged, and named Video Invasion. It was located at 3500 Bathurst Street in North York. It is just a few kilometers from Willowdale, the neighborhood of North York mentioned in "The Necromancer". Most famously, Brian May of Queen frequented the arcade, and there were pictures of him on the wall.

Reception
Classic Rock ranked the song number 6 on their list of "The 50 Greatest Rush Songs Ever".

Rolling Stone readers voted the song number 10 on "The 10 Best Rush Songs", writing that the song's music video had "the look and feel of an early episode of Degrassi High".

Ultimate Classic Rock ranked the song number 9 on their list of "Top 10 Rush Songs".

Personnel
Geddy Lee – lead and backing vocals, synthesizers (Oberheim OB-X, Minimoog), bass guitar
Alex Lifeson – electric guitar, backing vocals
Neil Peart – drums, spoken vocal

See also
List of Rush songs

References

1982 songs
1982 singles
Mercury Records singles
Rush (band) songs
Songs written by Alex Lifeson
Songs written by Geddy Lee
Songs written by Neil Peart
Song recordings produced by Terry Brown (record producer)
Works about suburbs
Synth rock songs